Nikos Skarmoutsos (born 16 March 1976 in Athens, Greece) is a professional football forward. He is currently training the football team of the Athens Bar Association, Solon FC, counting two domestic championships (2015 and 2016). He is also holder of a Union of European Football Associations A diploma and a successful personal trainer, specialized in tactics and technique development.

References

1976 births
Living people
Panetolikos F.C. players
Apollon Smyrnis F.C. players
PAOK FC players
Atromitos F.C. players
Panachaiki F.C. players
Aris Thessaloniki F.C. players
Kallithea F.C. players
Association football forwards
Footballers from Athens
Greek footballers